Georgia State Route 297 (SR 297) is a south-north state highway located in the east-central part of the U.S. state of Georgia. The route travels from SR 130/SR 292 in Vidalia to US 1/SR 4/SR 57 southeast of Swainsboro.

Route description
SR 297 begins at an intersection with SR 130/SR 292 in Vidalia. The highway leaves Vidalia along McIntosh Street. It travels north through rural portions of Toombs County. Shortly after its intersection with SR 298, the route encounters the quadripoint, the meeting point of Emanuel, Montgomery, Toombs, and Treutlen counties. SR 297 then straddles the Treutlen-Emanuel County line. The route intersects SR 46, then Interstate 16 (I-16), where it begins making a northeastward jaunt, before crossing the Ohoopee River and entering Emanuel County proper. The route continues northeast to meet its northern terminus, an intersection with US 1/SR 4/SR 57 southeast of Swainsboro.

SR 297 is a rural route, and sees an Average Annual Daily Traffic (AADT) of less than 5,000 vehicles over its whole length, with an AADT of less than 2,000 vehicles on the segment in Emanuel County.

History

Major intersections

See also

References

297
Transportation in Toombs County, Georgia
Transportation in Emanuel County, Georgia